Anna Memorial, locally known as Anna Samadhi or as Anna Square, is a memorial structure built on the Marina beach in Chennai, India. It was built in memory of former Chief Minister of Tamil Nadu, C. N. Annadurai (1967–69), who was cremated here in 1969. The memorial is also the burial place of his protégé M. Karunanidhi. The memorial lies on the northern end of the Marina abutting the MGR Memorial, the burial place of Karunanidhi's archrivals, M. G. Ramachandran and J. Jayalalithaa.

History

In 1996–1998, during the reign of the DMK party, the memorial was remodelled at a cost of  27.5 million and the entrance arch carried the design of the 'Rising Sun', the symbol of the DMK party. However, the design was removed after the opponent AIADMK party returned to power in May 2001. The renovation resulted in the original tusk-shaped entrance arch giving way to a highly polished marble tiled structure, widened pathways, and building of ornamental octagonal mantapams. After the Indian Ocean tsunami struck the coastal parts of the state in December 2004, the memorial, along with other structures on the seashore, was affected. Subsequently, repair works were undertaken at a cost of  13.3 million.

In 2012, the memorial was renovated at a cost of  12 million. In 2018, when his protégé M. Karunanidhi, died, he was buried behind his mentor. A new memorial for Karunanidhi is being planned at a cost of ₹390 million rupees.

Museum

The memorial also houses a museum on Annadurai, which is located at the northern side.

See also

 MGR Memorial
 Marina Beach

References

Tourist attractions in Chennai
Buildings and structures in Chennai
Monuments and memorials in Chennai
Memorials to C. N. Annadurai